The 1963 Waterford Senior Hurling Championship was the 63rd staging of the Waterford Senior Hurling Championship since its establishment by the Waterford County Board in 1897.

Erin's Own were the defending champions.

On 15 December 1963, Mount Sion won the championship after a 4-06 to 3–04 defeat of Ballugunner in the final. This was their 18th championship title overall and their first title since 1961.

References

Waterford Senior Hurling Championship
Waterford Senior Hurling Championship